Heteranthia is a monotypic genus of flowering plants belonging to the family Solanaceae. The only species is Heteranthia decipiens.

Its native range is Eastern Brazil.

References

Solanaceae
Monotypic Solanaceae genera